Digital compass may refer to:

 Digital magnetic compass, solid-state microelectromechanical system compasses
 Fibre optic gyrocompass, as in a ship's navigation system
 Magnetometer, such as a MEMS magnetometer in hand-held devices